Perry John Turnbull (born March 9, 1959) is a Canadian former professional ice hockey player who played 608 career games for the St. Louis Blues, Montreal Canadiens and Winnipeg Jets.

Turnbull's son is Travis Turnbull, also a professional ice hockey player.

Career statistics

Coaching statistics
Season  Team             Lge Type       GP  W L T OTL   Pct
1994-95 St. Louis Vipers RHI Head Coach 22 13 7 2   0 0.636

Awards
 WHL Second All-Star Team – 1979

External links

1959 births
Living people
Portland Winterhawks players
Calgary Centennials players
St. Louis Blues draft picks
St. Louis Blues players
Montreal Canadiens players
Winnipeg Jets (1979–1996) players
National Hockey League first-round draft picks
Ice hockey people from Alberta
St. Louis Vipers players
Canadian ice hockey left wingers